Qian Jiarui (born 30 May 1992) is a Chinese fencer. She competed in the women's individual sabre event at the 2018 Asian Games, winning the gold medal.

References

1992 births
Living people
Place of birth missing (living people)
Chinese female sabre fencers
Fencers at the 2018 Asian Games
Asian Games gold medalists for China
Asian Games silver medalists for China
Asian Games medalists in fencing
Medalists at the 2018 Asian Games
Nanjing Sport Institute alumni
Fencers at the 2020 Summer Olympics
Olympic fencers of China